Liu Sheng (born February 1956) is a lieutenant general (zhongjiang) of the People's Liberation Army (PLA) serving as deputy head of Equipment Development Department of the Central Military Commission. He was a delegate to the 11th National People's Congress. He was an alternate member of the 18th Central Committee of the Communist Party of China. He is a deputy to the 19th National Congress of the Communist Party of China.

Biography
Liu was born in Fuzhou, Fujian, in February 1956, while his ancestral home in Chaling County, Hunan. His father  was a founding lieutenant general (zhongjiang) the People's Liberation Army. His mother  was deputy chairperson of Shanghai People's Congress. His elder brother Liu Xiaorong is also a lieutenant general of the People's Liberation Army. He graduated from Northwestern Polytechnical University, majoring in aircraft engine.

Liu worked in the People's Liberation Army General Armaments Department, where he was head of Arms and Services Equipment Division in 2005, head of Co-ordination Planning Division in 2007, and deputy head of the General Armament Department in 2009. In 2016, he was appointed deputy head of the newly founded Equipment Development Department of the Central Military Commission.

References

1956 births
Living people
People from Chaling County
Northwestern Polytechnical University alumni
People's Liberation Army generals from Hunan
Delegates to the 11th National People's Congress
Alternate members of the 18th Central Committee of the Chinese Communist Party